This is a list of members of the tenth Australian Capital Territory Legislative Assembly, as elected at and subsequent to the October 2020 election.

 Yerrabi Liberal MLA Alistair Coe resigned from the Assembly on 12 March 2021. He was replaced via a countback of votes at the general election by James Milligan.
 Murrumbidgee Liberal MLA Giulia Jones resigned from the Assembly on 2 June 2022. She was replaced via a countback of votes at the general election by Ed Cocks.

See also
2020 Australian Capital Territory general election

References

Members of Australian Capital Territory parliaments by term
21st-century Australian politicians